Hayn may refer to:

Places
 Hayn, Saxony-Anhalt, Germany
 Hayn, old name for Großenhain, Germany
 , Germany
 , Germany
 Jabal al-ʿHayn, Saudi Arabia

Other
 Hayn (crater), a lunar crater
 Friedrich Hayn (1863–1928), German astronomer

See also
 Hain (disambiguation)